Rajsk  is a village in the administrative district of Gmina Bielsk Podlaski, within Bielsk County, Podlaskie Voivodeship, in north-eastern Poland.

According to the 1921 census, the village was inhabited by 341 people, among whom 15 were Roman Catholic, 322 Orthodox, and 4 Mosaic. At the same time, 196 inhabitants declared Polish nationality, 145 Belarusian. There were 71 residential buildings in the village.

References

Rajsk